The Cambridge History of the English Language is a six volume history of English published between 1992 and 2001. The general editor was Richard Hogg.

 Volume 1, The Beginnings to 1066, Richard Hogg, ed.
 Volume 2, 1066–1476, Norman Blake, ed.
 Volume 3, 1476–1776, Roger Lass, ed.
 Volume 4, 1776–1997, Suzanne Romaine, ed.
 Volume 5, English in Britain and Overseas: Origins and Development, Robert Burchfield, ed.
 Volume 6, English in North America, John Algeo, ed.

See also 

 The Cambridge Grammar of the English Language.

References 

Cambridge University Press books
English grammar books
Historical linguistics books